Chest compression may refer to:

 The prevention of the expansion of the chest, see Compressive asphyxia
 A technique used during cardiopulmonary resuscitation or for the treatment of choking